Joseph Page (9 January 1841 – 17 September 1907) was a New Zealand cricketer. He played in three first-class matches for Wellington from 1879 to 1881.

See also
 List of Wellington representative cricketers

References

External links
 

1841 births
1907 deaths
New Zealand cricketers
Wellington cricketers
People from Sudbury, Suffolk